Bohemanella is a monotypic genus of insects belonging to the family Acrididae. The only species is Bohemanella frigida.

The species was described by Boheman in 1846.

The species is native to Eurasia and Northwestern America.

Subspecies
These subspecies belong to the species Bohemanella frigida:
 Bohemanella frigida frigida (Boheman, 1846)
 Bohemanella frigida kamtchatkae (Sjöstedt, 1935)
 Bohemanella frigida strandi (Fruhstorfer, 1921)

References

External links

Melanoplinae
Acrididae genera
Monotypic Orthoptera genera